Aida Khalatian (born 17 November 1971), also known as Aida Khalatyan, is an Armenian female tennis player.

Playing for Armenia at the Fed Cup, Khalatian has a win–loss record of 5–4.

ITF Finals

Singles (1–1)

Doubles (6–3)

References

External links 
 
 

1971 births
Living people
Armenian female tennis players
Soviet female tennis players
Soviet Armenians